Meg McKinlay is a Western Australian writer. She has written a number of books for children and young adults, including How to Make a Bird and A Single Stone. She has won two Prime Minister's Literary Awards and three Crystal Kite Awards.

Biography 
Born Megan McKinlay, she spent her childhood in Bendigo, Victoria. During high school she was an exchange student in Japan. She graduated with a PhD from the University of Western Australia (UWA) in 2001 for her thesis "Gender and cross-cultural analysis: The novels of Tsushima Yûko 1976–1985". She subsequently lectured at UWA in Australian literature, Japanese and creative writing and,  was a honorary research associate of that university.

In 2010 she won a residency in Japan and in 2020 she won a May Gibbs Children's Literature Trust Fellowship. As well as writing for children and young adults, she has published one book of poetry, Cleanskin.

As of 2021 McKinlay lives in Fremantle, Western Australia.

Awards 

 Surface Tension
 2012 Davitt Award, Best Young Adult Novel winner
 Ten Tiny Things
 2013 Crystal Kite Award, New Zealand/Australia regional winner
 A Single Stone
 2015 Aurealis Award for best children's fiction winner
 2015 Queensland Literary Awards, Children's Book Award winner
 2016 Prime Minister's Literary Awards,Young Adult Fiction winner
 Catch a Falling Star
 2019 Western Australian Premier's Book Awards, winner Prize for Writing for Children
 2020 Crystal Kite Award New Zealand/Australia regional winner
 How to Make a Bird
 2020 Western Australian Premier's Book Awards, winner Prize for Writing for Children
 2021Prime Minister's Literary Awards, Children's Fiction winner
 2021 Crystal Kite Award, New Zealand/Australia regional winner
 2021 Children's Book of the Year Award: Picture Book winner

Selected works 

 The Truth about Penguins, co-authored with Mark Jackson, 2010
 Surface Tension, 2011
 Ten Tiny Things, illustrated by Kyle Hughes-Odgers, 2012
 A Single Stone, 2015
 Duck!, illustrated by Nathaniel Eckstrom, 2018
 Catch a Falling Star, 2019
 How to Make a Bird, illustrated by Matt Ottley, 2020
 Bella and the Voyaging House, illustrated by Nicholas Schafer, 2021

References

External links 

 

Living people
Year of birth missing (living people)
Australian children's writers
21st-century Australian women writers
University of Western Australia alumni
Academic staff of the University of Western Australia